The 2017–18 Idaho Vandals women's basketball team represents the University of Idaho during the 2017–18 NCAA Division I women's basketball season. The Vandals, led by tenth year head coach Jon Newlee, play their home games at the Cowan Spectrum with early season games at Memorial Gym, and are members of the Big Sky Conference. They finished the season 19–14, 13–5 in Big Sky play to finish in second place. They advanced to the championship game of the Big Sky women's tournament where they lost to Northern Colorado. They received an automatic bid to the Women's National Invitation Tournament where they lost to UC Davis in the first round.

Roster

Schedule

|-
!colspan=9 style=| Exhibition

|-
!colspan=9 style=| Non-conference regular season

|-
!colspan=9 style=| Big Sky regular season

|-
!colspan=9 style=| Big Sky Women's Tournament

|-
!colspan=9 style=| WNIT

See also
2017–18 Idaho Vandals men's basketball team

References

Idaho Vandals women's basketball seasons
Idaho
Van
Van
Idaho